Brehy is a village and municipality in the Žarnovica District, Banská Bystrica Region in Slovakia.

History
In historical records, the village was first mentioned in 1283 when German colonists arrived here for overworking local mines of silver (from I. Lasslob "Deutsche Ortsnamen in der Slowakei") In 1339 the King gave the village to the Sz. Elizabeth Hospital in Nová Baňa, in 1601 it passed to the noble Dóczy family.

Genealogical resources

The records for genealogical research are available at the state archive "Statny Archiv in Banska Bystrica, Slovakia"

 Roman Catholic church records (births/marriages/deaths): 1784-1896 (parish A)
 Lutheran church records (births/marriages/deaths): 1812-1895 (parish B)

See also
 List of municipalities and towns in Slovakia

External links
https://web.archive.org/web/20070513023228/http://www.statistics.sk/mosmis/eng/run.html
http://www.region.novabana.sk/html/indexbre.htm 
http://www.e-obce.sk/obec/brehy/brehy.html
Surnames of living people in Brehy

Villages and municipalities in Žarnovica District